The 1992 Saskatchewan Roughriders season was the 78th season in the club's 82nd year of existence. The team finished in 3rd place in the Canadian Football League's West Division with an 9–9 record. The Roughriders qualified for the playoffs, but lost the West Semi-Final game to the Edmonton Eskimos.

Offseason

CFL Draft

Preseason

Regular season

Season Standings

Season schedule

Postseason

Schedule

Awards and records 
CFL's Most Outstanding Canadian Award – Ray Elgaard (SB), Saskatchewan Roughriders
Commissioner's Award - Tom Shepherd, Saskatchewan Roughriders

1992 CFL All-Stars 
SB – Ray Elgaard
OT – Vic Stevenson
DT – Jearld Baylis
DE – Bobby Jurasin
DS – Glen Suitor

1992 Western All-Stars 
SB – Ray Elgaard
OT – Vic Stevenson
DT – Jearld Baylis
DE – Bobby Jurasin
DS – Glen Suitor

References 

Saskatchewan Roughriders seasons
1992 Canadian Football League season by team
1992 in Saskatchewan